Immanuel Church, Birmingham, later known as St Thomas and Immanuel, Birmingham was a Church of England parish church in Birmingham.

History

The church was built on the site of the Magdalen Chapel. It was designed by Edward Holmes and consecrated on 16 May 1865 by the Bishop of Worcester, and a parish assigned out of St Thomas' Church, Bath Row

In 1939 the church was closed and the parish united with St Thomas' Church, Bath Row. It was re-opened after St Thomas was destroyed in a bombing raid in 1940. The church finally closed and was demolished around 1964. The font was moved to St Mary's Church, Wythall.

Organ

The church had a pipe organ by Bird. A specification of the organ can be found on the National Pipe Organ Register. When the church was closed, the organ was moved to St Faith and St Laurence's Church, Harborne.

References

Church of England church buildings in Birmingham, West Midlands
Churches completed in 1865
Immanuel